Janko Langura is a Serbian politician and former professional footballer. He played as a goalkeeper from 2013 to 2019 and has been a member of the National Assembly of Serbia since 2020. Langura is a member of the Serbian Progressive Party.

Early life and football career
Langura was born in Priboj, Serbia, in what was then the Federal Republic of Yugoslavia. He has a bachelor's degree in economics.

He was signed to FK Metalac Gornji Milanovac (2013), FK Rudar Kostolac (2013–15), FK Loznica (2015), FK Mačva Šabac (2016), FK Dinamo Vranje (2017), FK Takovo (2017–18),  FK Železničar (2018) and FK Metalac Gornji Milanovac again (2018–19). He saw action in four games: one for Loznica and three for Dimano Vranje. He now lives in Gornji Milanovac.

Politician
Langura first became known to the public in October 2019, when he verbally clashed with the leader of Dveri, Boško Obradović. In February 2020, Langura was physically assaulted and on that occasion he sustained head injuries.

Langura received the 155th position on the Progressive Party's Aleksandar Vučić — For Our Children list in the 2020 Serbian parliamentary election and was elected when the list won a landslide majority with 188 out of 250 mandates. He is now a member of the assembly committee on the diaspora and Serbs in the region; a deputy member of the committee on the economy, regional development, trade, tourism, and energy; a deputy member of the committee on finance, state budget, and control of public spending; the leader of Serbia's parliamentary friendship group with Kuwait; and a member of the parliamentary friendship groups with Norway, Slovenia, Sweden, and Switzerland.

He was also given the fifth position on the Progressive Party's list for the Gornji Milanovac municipal assembly in the concurrent 2020 Serbian local elections and was elected when the list won a majority with twenty-seven out of forty-nine seats.

References

1994 births
Living people
People from Priboj
People from Gornji Milanovac
Members of the National Assembly (Serbia)
Serbian Progressive Party politicians
Serbian First League players
Serbian SuperLiga players
FK Mačva Šabac players
Association football goalkeepers
FK Loznica players
FK Dinamo Vranje players
FK Metalac Gornji Milanovac players
FK Takovo players
FK Železničar Lajkovac players
FK Rudar Kostolac players
Serbian footballers